The Leonardo da Vinci programme is a European Commission funding programme focused on the teaching and training needs of those involved in vocational education and training (VET). The programme is part of the European Commission's Lifelong Learning Programme 2007–2013 and aims to build a skilled and mobile workforce across Europe.

Aims 
The programme aims to enhance the competitiveness of the European labour market by helping European citizens to acquire new skills, knowledge and qualifications and have them recognised across borders. It also supports innovations and improvements in vocational education and training systems and practices.

Funding 
The programme funds a wide range of actions, including transnational mobility and European projects focusing on the development or the transfer of innovation and networks. All of the projects funded by the Leonardo da Vinci programme involve working with European partners. The programme addresses trainees in initial vocational training, people on the labour market and professionals in vocational education and training, as well as any organisation active in this field.

History 
The Leonardo da Vinci programme was started in 1995.

In 1998 the whistleblowing of Paul van Buitenen criticised misdirection of funds in the EU, particularly in Leonardo da Vinci vocational training programmes.

A second, broader phase (Leonardo II 2000–2006) concentrated on skills and employability of young people.
Of the 21,000 projects financed in this phase, 19,000 had to do with mobility, supporting 367,000 individuals.
The budget was €1.45 billion.
Phase II was evaluated for the Directorate General for Education and Culture of the European Commission in 2008.

In 2007 a new programme was started, to run until 2013.

Projects supported 
 Central (Certification for Employment iN Transport and Logistics in Europe) Project
 Certification & Accreditation System for Financial Services Sector Education and Training – (see International Training Center for Bankers)
 CHIRON – benchmarking e-learning
 DISCO – European Dictionary of Skills and Competences
 EADIS – European Automotive Digital Innovation Studio – training and infrastructure to keep European automotive industry competitive
 ECOTOOL – harmonisation of VET certification
 Forestur – training for tourism professionals
 MarTEL – a test of maritime English language proficiency
 Ploteus (Portal on Learning Opportunities Throughout European Space)

See also 
 Apprentices mobility

References

External links 
European Union – The Lifelong Learning Programme 2007–2013
UK – The Lifelong Learning Programme 2007–2013
UK – Leonardo programme

Educational policies and initiatives of the European Union
Training programs
Vocational education in Europe
Leonardo da Vinci